Scotty Scott may refer to:

Montgomery Scott, a Star Trek character, most recognizable for his role in the misquoted phrase "Beam me up, Scotty"
Harold "Scotty" Scott, American soul singer and member of the Temprees
Howard "Scotty" Scott, jazz trombonist
Kermit Scott (musician), American jazz saxophonist
Wallace "Scotty" Scott, American rhythm and blues singer and member of the Whispers